The Freshie is a 1922 American silent Western comedy film directed by William Hughes Curran  and starring Guinn 'Big Boy' Williams, Molly Malone and Lincoln Stedman.

Synopsis
A vacationing professor convinces cowboy Charles Taylor that he should go to college to get an education. However he finds it takes him a while to settle down to university life.

Cast
 Guinn 'Big Boy' Williams as Charles Taylor
 Molly Malone as Violet Blakely
 Lincoln Stedman as Tubby Tarpley
 James McElhern as Professor Noyes
 Edward Burns as Ranch Foreman
 Lee Phelps as Tom
 Sam Armstrong as Jack
 Buck Russell as Society Sam 
 Jules Hanft as Mr. Blakely

References

Bibliography
 Connelly, Robert B. The Silents: Silent Feature Films, 1910-36, Volume 40, Issue 2. December Press, 1998.
 Munden, Kenneth White. The American Film Institute Catalog of Motion Pictures Produced in the United States, Part 1. University of California Press, 1997.

External links
 

1922 films
1922 Western (genre) films
1922 comedy films
1920s English-language films
American silent feature films
1920s Western (genre) comedy films
American black-and-white films
Films directed by William Hughes Curran
1920s American films
Silent American Western (genre) comedy films